Najmabad (also Romanized as Najmābād) is a village in Hangam Rural District, in the Central District of Qir and Karzin County, Fars Province, Iran. At the 2006 census, its population was 18, in 7 families.

References 

Populated places in Qir and Karzin County